Van Lear may refer to:

Places
 Van Lear, Kentucky
 Van Lear, Maryland
 Vanleer, Tennessee

People
 Phillip Edward Van Lear, American actor
 Thomas Van Lear (1864–1931), mayor of Minneapolis, Minnesota
 Van Lear Black (1875–1930), American publisher and civil aviation pioneer

See also
 Van Laer
 Van Leer (disambiguation)
 Van Lier
 Vanleer